, or HeartCatch Pretty Cure! is a Japanese anime series and the seventh installment in the Pretty Cure metaseries by Izumi Todo, featuring the fifth generation of Cures. Produced by Toei Animation, the series is directed by Tatsuya Nagamine and written by Takashi Yamada. Official character designs were done by Yoshihiko Umakoshi. The series premiered on February 7, 2010 on TV Asahi's ANN network, following Fresh Pretty Cure!, and ended on January 30, 2011, where it was followed by Suite PreCure.

The series has three topics: the first - and foremost - is the language of flowers, of which most episodes contain at least one reference; the second is fashion, which is referenced in Tsubomi joining the fashion club; the third - and final - is music, as all of the Cures' attacks are named after musical terms and it also contains some music-themed episodes. In fact, the cure's main motifs are related to flowers, nature, and music, which are all prominent in the naming of numerous characters and items, as well as in the main storyline.

Story
In each person resides a Heart Flower, which is connected to the great Heart Tree that watches over everyone. Protecting this tree are the HeartCatch Pretty Cures, who defend it against the Desert Apostles, who plan to wilt everything and turn the world into a desert. However, when the current Pretty Cure, Cure Moonlight, has been defeated in battle and the Heart Tree loses its flowers, she sends two fairies, Chypre and Coffret, to the surface in order to seek out her replacement. They find Tsubomi Hanasaki, a shy flower-loving girl that had just moved into the city with her family, who is given the power to become Cure Blossom. Joined by her new friend, Erika Kurumi, who becomes Cure Marine, they fight against the Desert Apostles who transform the wilting Heart Flowers inside people into monsters known as Desertarians. By defeating these monsters, they gain Heart Seeds which allow the Heart Tree to become healthier again.

Characters

HeartCatch Pretty Cures
  

The main protagonist. Tsubomi is 14 years old and in the second year of the private Myōdō Academy's Junior High School branch. She loves every plant and would like to join the gardener's club, but then she is taken into the Fashion Club by Erika. Her house is the "Hanasaki Flower Shop". She is an upright person, but also shy and withdrawn, which is almost a complex of hers. She sees her change of schools as a chance to change herself. Indeed, after she meets Erika, she will slowly start to change. In the first fight when Erika was controlled as desertrian, she wants to save Erika and is half-forced by fairies to become a Pretty Cure. As Cure Blossom, her dark red hair becomes light pink and her flower symbol is the cherry blossom. Her powers are related to flowers and she can use auxiliary attacks such as Blossom Flower Storm and Blossom Double Impact in addition to her finishing attack. Unlike other Pretty Cure protagonists, she is not greedy with food and she enjoys studying. Her theme color is pink.
She introduces herself as 

 

Erika is 13 years old and Tsubomi's classmate, neighbor and daughter of the owner of the fashion shop "Fairy Drop". In addition, she is the president of the Fashion Club. She loves fashion and designing her own clothing. She has a jealous complex towards her beautiful and fashionable older sister, who is a Charisma Model despite still being in high school. She is an energetic girl and bluntly says what she is thinking, although she also begins to change after meeting Tsubomi. She makes Tsubomi join the Fashion Club after all old members signed off. After she is informed the qualification of Pretty Cure, she agrees to help in the fight of Tsubomi. As Cure Marine, her dark blue hair becomes light blue, and her flower symbol is a blue daisy. She has powers related to the ocean and can use auxiliary attacks such as Marine Shoot and Marine Dynamite in addition to her finishing attack. Her theme color is blue.
She introduces herself as 

 

Itsuki is 14 years old and in the second year, the student council president and the granddaughter of the current principal of Myōdō Academy. Itsuki appears to be a gentle, handsome, and athletic boy with a princely demeanor who attracts many subordinates and fans. At the beginning, Tsubomi developed a temporary admiration for Itsuki until discovering her female gender. She crossdresses due to her having to substitute as the heir of the school and dojo in place of her ailing older brother. However, she maintains a great love for cute, girl things and is convinced to join the fashion club. In the events of Episode 22, she picked up Potpourri and thinks it's cute. She later becomes Cure Sunshine to rescue Tsubomi and Erika from danger with Potpourri while saving her brother's Heart Flower. As Cure Sunshine, her short brown hair becomes longer and becomes golden and her flower symbol is the sunflower. Her powers are related to the sun and can use auxiliary attacks such as Sunflower Aegis and Sunshine Flash, in addition to her finishing attack. Her theme color is yellow.
She introduces herself as 

 
  
Yuri is 17 years old and Momoka's friend, also in the second year of Myōdō Academy's high school branch. She shares class notes with Momoka when the latter cannot attend classes because of her job, also she heads the list of successful candidates in the grade. Her father went missing during the investigation of the "Heart Tree" in France. At the beginning of the story, she was defeated during the fight against Dark Precure, rendering her Pretty Cure Seed broken and the Heart Tree withering. Since Yuri's fairy partner, Cologne died, she could not transform since her Pretty Cure Seed was broken. Scarred by this, she isn't willing to help new Pretty Cures. But later the Heart Tree and the Heart Pot recover her Pretty Cure seed and allocate her status of Pretty Cure again. As Cure Moonlight, her dark purple hair becomes lighter and her flower symbol is the rose. Cure Moonlight has powers related to the moon and can use auxiliary attacks in addition to her finishing attack. Her theme color is purple.
She introduces herself as

Fairies
Rather than other fairies in previous series of Pretty Cure, the fairies were born in the Heart Tree in order. Each one could separately find their own partner of Pretty Cure. Unlike previous mascots who end their sentences with a word typically referring to their own name, the fairies all end their sentences with "desu".

A fairy who protects the Heart Tree. In order to save it from danger, she has come to look for Pretty Cure, the legendary warriors chosen by the Heart Tree. She gives Tsubomi the Pretty Cure Seed in order to activate her Heart Perfume, allowing her to change into Cure Blossom. She often disguises herself as a stuffed animal. She has the power to give birth to Heart Seeds. It is said that if you collect them, a miracle will happen. Chypre tends to be calmer than her fellow mascot, Coffret. She often behaves as if she is Tsubomi's big sister. She is named after the floral perfume family, chypre.

He, like Chypre, protects the Heart Tree and gives Erika the power to change into Cure Marine. He also tends to disguise himself as a stuffed animal and can give birth to Heart Seeds. Erika needs his Pretty Cure seed to activate her Heart Perfume, allowing her to transform into Cure Marine. He is rather bold, being borderline insulting at times and nice to others. He is something like a little brother to Erika. His name comes from the French term for a jewelry box or casket.

Appearing in episode 20, Potpourri is a baby fairy born from the Heart Tree, who is colored orange-white rather than cyan-white like Chypre and Coffret. Potpourri carries an orange Heart Seed in her bag as the key to Pretty Cure Palace. Potpourri can cast a powerful barrier to protect others. Potpourri can be rash and bratty at times, but has a strong desire to protect Pretty Cure. In Episode 22, Potpourri found a true candidate, Itsuki Myoudouin, to be Cure Sunshine. Potpourri is named after potpourri, a mixture of dried plants used to provide fragrance. Being younger than both Chypre and Coffret, Potpourri tends to end her sentences with 'de-chu' instead of 'desu'.

Appearing in episode 33, Cologne was Yuri's partner fairy before sacrificing himself to protect her. He had nursed Chypre and Coffret since their birth, behaving calmly as their elder brother. Now his spirit exists in the Heart Tree and keeps watching them. He is also colored differently from other fairies with lavender-white instead of cyan-white like Chypre and Coffret. He is named after cologne, a type of perfume for men.

A giant fairy that stays in the Botanical Garden that Tsubomi's grandmother cares for. He doesn't talk, but he's always watching over Tsubomi and Erika. He is a legendary fairy that is said to have supported the legendary Pretty Cure, Cure Flower, in the past. The younger fairies admired him. He actually has the ability to transform into human, usually as Kaoruko's husband, Hanasaki Sora. He saved Pretty Cures in several times though they don't know who the mysterious guy was. It reveals until he guards the Heartcatch Mirage to test Pretty Cures and is defeated to leak his identity. He is named after Coupé, a type of closed car body style used on hardtop sports cars.

Kibougahana residents
 

Tsubomi's grandmother, and Yoichi’s widowed mother, a famous botanist and owner of the Flower Shop. Kaoruko is considered wise and kind, and cares deeply for her granddaughter. She loves flowers more than anything, affecting Tsubomi a lot. She is also a strong person who has the fame of the youngest champion in the history of national judo contest. In fact, she was Cure Flower in her youth, the previous senior of Cure Moonlight in Pretty Cure universe. Kaoruko became Pretty Cure after she met Coupe when she came there to study the Tree of Hearts. She once defeated Dune with Heartcatch Mirage, but at the cost of her own Pretty Cure Seed being destroyed in the aftermath. At some point, she met all the present Pretty Cures and fairies. In Episode 44, her Christmas wish is to become Cure Flower again for one day to help Tsubomi and the others. As Cure Flower, her theme color is Scarlet and her flower symbol is the Lotus Flower. Her attacks are related to flowers just like Tsubomi, but she lacks the power to conjure up stronger attacks such as Forte Wave.
She introduces herself as 

Tsubomi's mother, a florist of Hanasaki Flower Shop. She was an officer of a famous florist chain supplier "Red Florian". She gives birth to the second daughter  after the story ends.

Tsubomi's father, and Kaoruko's only son, also the florist of Hanasaki Flower Shop and a part-time professor.

Tsubomi's late grandfather, Kaoruko's husband, and Yoichi’s father, who died after his son's birth. He was a cellist living alone in Kamakura. He met his future wife at his cabin built in a lavender forest.

Erika's mother, host of Fairy Drop. Also a famous former model.

Erika's father, a famous photographer with a craving for taking pictures of his loving wife and daughters.

Erika's older sister, in the second year of the private Myōdō Academy's Senior High School branch, nicknamed Momo-nee by Erika. She is a popular part-time model, always making Erika jealous. In Episode 8, she was revealed to be equally jealous of Erika's ability to easily make friends.

Itsuki's mother, she's the daughter of Gentarou.

Itsuki's older brother, who has a condition where he can't walk properly. Originally the heir and an outstanding fighter who influenced Itsuki a lot. In contrast to his sister's masculine appearance, Satsuki exhibits an effeminate appearance.

Itsuki's grandfather, he's the principal of Myōdō academy and the leader of the town's local dojo.

Yuri's mother. She has earned her livelihood alone in the convenience store near the local train station since her husband disappeared.

Tsubomi and Erika's home room teacher in Myōdō Academy, strict but reliable. She is afraid of ghosts, which she thinks is holding her back from her teaching.

Tsubomi and Erika's classmate, a fan of Itsuki in private. Ever since her mother died, she has acted as a mother to her younger sister Rumi, leaving her little time for outside activities such as the fashion club. However, she changed her mind in Episode 14.

, Yukiko Hanioka, Tomo Adachi, Seiko Yoshida
Tsubomi and Erika's classmates.

Tsubomi and Erika's classmate, Kanae adores photography and loves to catch funny scenes with her prized camera. She is eager to take pictures of Pretty Cure.

Desert Apostles
The  are the main antagonists of the series. They are a notorious group whose aims were to collect wilted Heart Flowers from their victims and take over the world by turning it into a giant desert. They're also responsible for the withering of the Great Tree of Hearts. It's revealed in Episode 20 that the Desert Apostles were serving Dune and taking orders from him.

Dune is the leader of the Desert Apostles and the main antagonist, who has been in deep sleep after he was defeated by Cure Flower and sealed his powers into a locket. He is first shown as a shadow on a video screen, talking to Sabaku about the new fairy that has been born and in flashbacks and in several episodes. Dune arrived at Earth after regaining his strength and sent a Desert Seed down to Earth which quickly turned into a Desert Devil. His true intentions is to destroy the Tree of Hearts.

 

The right hand man of Dune and also Yuri's long-lost father, Hideaki Tsukikage is a brilliant scientist and researcher who went missing during the investigation of the Tree of Hearts. As he is brainwashed after Baron Salamander give him a mask, he became Professor Sabark. He is usually seen sitting on a chair on a high level in the Desert Apostles' base, always having his right-hand Dark Precure by his side. He is almost never seen without his mask.  He wishes to finish off the newest generation of Pretty Cure in order to take down the Tree of Hearts. After the mask shatters in Episode 48 and freeing him from the Desert Apostle's control, he himself confronted Dune but was ultimately killed while saving Cure Blossom and Moonlight. The ashes from his remains were later buried in Yuri's hometown in Yamanashi Prefecture.

Dark Precure is beside Sabark whenever a Desert Apostle has audience with him, acting as his second-in-command. In the beginning of the story, she fought against Cure Moonlight in front of the Heart Tree and won her half broken Pretty Cure Seed. She has an overwhelming strength of battle that can beat Cure Blossom and Cure Marine easily and strip them of Pretty Cure mode. Despite this, she has a deep conscious of competition against Cure Moonlight, who is her best rival. It is hinted that Dark Precure and Cure Moonlight are related in episode 47, where she refers to the recently unmasked Professor Sabark as her father. It is officially revealed in episode 48, where Sabaku reveals that some of Yuri's DNA was used for her creation. Dark Precure was defeated by Moonlight's Floral Power Fortissimo in episode 47, and she died in the next episode.

Kumojacky is the leader of the three cadets of Sabark. Although evil, Kumojacky believes in fair fights, and would never fight enemies that are too weak. Kumojacky has shown to have a constant passionate personality wherever he goes. He likes to see other people's pain, and has no problem using this to his liking. Full of himself, he claims that not even one hundred Cures can defeat him. Despite this, he is mannered, and always introduces himself to someone he is going to use or fight with. However, he never hesitates to tell people their weaknesses, and even encourage them into becoming stronger.

Sasorina is one of the three cadets of Sabark, and the first to appear before the heroines. She speaks with a foreign accent and can use her hair as a scorpion tail with poison. Most of the time, Sasorina has a calm aura around her, and always carries a smirk unless panicking or provoked. When provoked, she loses her calm personality and gets angry. Sasorina looks down on weak people, but will acknowledge strong foes. Her name is deprived from sasori, meaning 'scorpion'.

Cobraja is one of the three cadets of Sabark. He is very narcissistic, always thinking he is the most beautiful man in the universe. He often makes Snackey take pictures of him posing or make people give him attention. In front of Pretty Cures, he has the power of battle though he wouldn't let his face hurt and thinks to be admired by Pretty Cures at first. He can also throw lethal autographs to attack others.

The Snackeys are a numerous group of servants in the Desert Apostles. Unlike the three other members, the Snackeys act more like their servants, fulfilling all their orders and requests. They cannot talk properly, and instead only uses the word "Ki" when talking. They can be seen in all kinds of different shapes.

The monsters of the week, which are formed by fusing stolen wilted Heart Flowers with objects. Unlike monsters in the previous Pretty Cure series, these speak the worries of the person's Heart Flower which caused it to wilt. The stronger the person's fear or worry, the more wilted Heart Flowers they'll have, and the stronger the Desertian will be. Later in the series, the Cadets of Sabark gain Dark Bracelets, allowing them to take direct control of a Desertrian if its motives waver, making them more powerful in the process.

Film-only characters
 

Olivier is the right hand child of Baron Salamander and his foster son, who first appeared in Episode 48 in Dune's flashback. In the movie, he is adopted by Baron Salamander after he unsealed him from his 400-year prison. He and Baron Salamander were the only surviving members of the Desert Apostles after the organization's defeat.

Baron Salamander is a lost member of the Desert Apostles and originally, the right-hand man of Dune before Professor Sabark took his place. He is mentioned once by Dune in Episode 48, as the one who give Yuri's father a mask that Sabark is wearing, allowing him to take control of his mind to serve Dune. In the movie, he is the main antagonist who awakened after 400 years after being defeated by Cure Angie and  sealed inside the abbey on Mont Saint-Michel in France.

Media

Anime

The anime, directed by Tatsuya Nagamine and produced by Toei Animation, aired in Japan on ABC and other ANN stations between February 7, 2010 and January 30, 2011. The series uses three pieces of theme music, one opening and two ending themes.

Print
A manga adaptation by Futago Kamikita began serialization in Kodansha's Nakayoshi magazine From March 2010 until February 2011. A novel adaptation, which expands the series was then released on September 16, 2015 under Kodansha's Character Bunko label. It is written by Takashi Yamada and illustrated by Yoshihiko Umakoshi.

Films
A movie based on the HeartCatch PreCure series titled  was released in Japan on October 30, 2010. It follows the Pretty Cures as they go to France and encounter a mysterious boy named Olivier, who is being manipulated by the mysterious villain, Baron Salamander. The French-language version released by Imagine in France on January 26, 2011 under the title HeartCatch Pretty Cure! Le film: Mission défilé à Paris (HeartCatch Pretty Cure! The Movie: The Paris Show Mission). The film has been nominated for a Kidscreen Award for Best One-off, Special or TV Movie for Kids.

The heroines also appear in all Pretty Cure All Stars movies, starting with  The DX2 movie was released on March 20, 2010.

Video games
There are currently three videogames based on the series produced by Bandai. An educational game, was released for the Sega Beena on July 22, 2010.  is a minigame collection for the Nintendo DS and was released on August 5, 2010. Another DS title, released on November 11, 2010, allows players to record their own voices over scenes from the anime.

Reception
In Japan alone, HeartCatch PreCure! is both the most popular series in the Pretty Cure anime franchise to date and also the darkest, with certain tones reflecting personal drama between each of the main characters and villains. The series' success received a cult following by fans and praises of the series' overall presentation and story. The series' character designer, Yoshihiko Umakoshi was also awarded as best Character Designer in the 2010 Tokyo Anime Awards and the 2011 Tokyo International Anime Fair.

It was also one of the selected anime series of the year in the December 2010 issue of British magazine Impact.

See also
Language of flowers
Hanakotoba

References

External links
Toei Animation's HeartCatch PreCure! site 
ABC's HeartCatch PreCure! site 
 

2011 Japanese television series endings
2011 comics endings
2010s Japanese-language films
Pretty Cure
TV Asahi original programming
Anime series
Magical girl anime and manga
2010 anime films
2015 Japanese novels
Films set in Paris
Films set in France
Light novels
Toei Animation television
Toei Animation films